The Nelson River, is located in the UNESCO World Heritagelisted Tasmanian Wilderness, in the West Coast region of Tasmania, Australia.  It is a tributary into Lake Burbury, previously directly into the upper region of King River

The river valley is part of the King River glaciation area.  In general it is distinguished from the glacialisation on the western side of the West Coast Range.

The river valley is the location of limestone caves, that have been studied for archaeological materials.

Location and features

It includes the Nelson Falls feature in the valley.

See also

 Kutikina_Cave

References

Rivers of Tasmania
Western Tasmania